The 2006 National Pro Fastpitch season was the third season of professional softball under the name National Pro Fastpitch (NPF) for  the only professional women's fastpitch softball league in the United States.  From 1997 to 2002, NPF operated under the names Women's Pro Fastpitch (WPF) and Women's Pro Softball League (WPSL).   Each year, the playoff teams battle for the Cowles Cup.

Teams, cities and stadiums

Milestones and events
2004 NPF champion New York Juggernaut and the California Sunbirds (who played a partial schedule in 2005) were not on the 2006 schedule and ceased operations.

In September 2005, NPF announced the addition of the expansion team Philadelphia Force, owned by brothers William M. and John M. Thompson.  The Force named Patriots Park in Allentown, Pennsylvania, as their home stadium.  One of their first signings included 2004 Olympic Gold Medalist Natasha Watley. The Force did play at ECTB Stadium at Bicentennial Park in Allentown.

NPF announced that Patrick J. Linden had become their new president.  An attorney, Linden has experience as counsel for the NPF owner's group.

Player acquisition

College draft

The 2006 NPF Senior Draft was held 138, 2006 via conference call.  Cat Osterman of Texas was selected first by the Connecticut Brakettes.  Osterman opted not to sign with the Brakettes, becoming a free agent at the end of the 2006 season.

Notable transactions
Sarah Pauly signed her initial NPF contract, as the first player signed by the Connecticut Brakettes.  In 2005 as a member of the amateur Stratford Brakettes, Pauly pitched against NPF teams.

League standings 
Source 

NPF's 2006 schedule was 48 games for each team, including seven four-game home series and five four-game road series.  On the schedule were games against national teams from Canada, China and Chinese Taipei, as well as Denso Japan, a professional team. The USA Softball Team, World University Games Team and the Michigan Ice, a hopeful for NPF membership, were also scheduled as opponents.  The results counted in the NPF's team records.

NPF Championship

The 2006 NPF Championship Series was held at Frank DeLuca Hall of Fame Field in Stratford, Connecticut August 26 and 28.  The top four teams qualified and were seeded based on the final standings.  The series matched the teams up in a single-elimination bracket.  The championship game was scheduled for August 27, but rain forced it to be moved to August 28.

Championship Game

Annual awards
Source:

See also

 List of professional sports leagues
 List of professional sports teams in the United States and Canada

References

External links 
 

Softball teams
2006 in women's softball
2006 in American women's sports
Softball in the United States